Jimmy Hill (1928–2015), was a British professional footballer and sports broadcaster.

Jimmy Hill may also refer to:
 Jimmy Hill (Scottish footballer) (1872–after 1900), Scottish footballer
 Jimmy Hill (footballer, born 1935), Northern Irish professional footballer and manager
 Jimmy Hill (American football) (born 1928), American football player
 Jimmy Hill (broadcaster, born 1989), English radio, television, and Internet personality
 Jimmy Hill (baseball) (1918–1993), Negro league baseball player

See also 
 James Hill (disambiguation)
 Jim Hill (disambiguation)
 Hill (surname)